Zamrony M. Dun (born 10 March 1988) is an Indonesian professional footballer who plays as a defensive midfielder.

Club career

PSPS Riau
He was signed for PSPS Riau to play in Liga 2 in the 2018 season.

Persiraja Banda Aceh
He was signed for Persiraja Banda Aceh to play in the middle season of Liga 2 in 2018.

Persis Solo
In 2021, Zamrony signed a contract with Indonesian Liga 2 club Persis Solo.

Honours

Club
Persiraja Banda Aceh
 Liga 2 third place (play-offs): 2019

References

External links
 Zamrony at Liga Indonesia
 Zamrony at Soccerway

1988 births
Living people
Indonesian footballers
PSPS Riau players
Association football midfielders
People from Ternate
Sportspeople from North Maluku